Artviže is a small village in the Municipality of Hrpelje-Kozina in the Littoral region of Slovenia.

Name
Artviže was attested in written sources in 1443 as Hertwisekh. The name is derived from the Middle High German personal name Hartwig via a denominal adjective form.

Church
The church in the settlement is dedicated to the local saint, Saint Servulus, who lived in a cave close to Socerb, and belongs to the Parish of Brezovica.

References

External links
Artviže on Geopedia

Populated places in the Municipality of Hrpelje-Kozina